McLure is a settlement in British Columbia. Carl's fruit stand on the Yellowhead Highway is a popular stop for tourists.
There is also the McLure reaction ferry which is the only crossing of the North Thompson River between Kamloops and Barriere.

Settlements in British Columbia